Owen Bonnici (born 24 May 1980) is a Maltese politician who is currently serving as the Minister for the National Heritage, the Arts and Local Government.

He previously served as Pariamentary Secretary for Justice, Minister for Justice, Culture and Local Government, Minister for Education and Employment, and Minister Equality, Research and Innovation.

Political life
Bonnici was first elected to Parliament in 2008 at the age of 27 from the third electoral district - a seat vacated by Helena Dalli. The district was made up of the residents of the towns of Fgura, Marsascala and Zejtun.

Prior to his election to Parliament, he served on the Local Council of Marsascala for five years, first as a Councillor and then as Deputy Mayor, and as an elected member of the Labour Executive Council (2004-2008).. As a lawyer in private practice, Bonnici also represented the residents' lobby group for an appeal against the Marsascala recycling plant. This appeal was initially turned down, but later, but later the Civil Court in its Constitutional jurisdiction decided that the appeal should be heard again.

In 2004, he also contested for European parliament elections as a Labour Party Candidate. 

He served as Opposition Spokesperson for Youth and Culture and subsequently for Higher Education, University, Research and Culture and voiced against issues like censorship and advocated for other liberal issues.

During his first term, he was actively involved in the Divorce Bill when the Labour Party appointed him to coordinate through the views and suggestions of the elected members of his party and also engage with the opposition party members.

He was again handsomely elected in the March 2013 elections as the strongest candidate in the district.

Major Reforms

Prime Minister Joseph Muscat appointed him Parliamentary Secretary responsible for Justice and then Minister for Justice, Culture and Local Government. In 2013, he worked on a bill with Prime Minister Muscat that corruption cases against politicians are not time barred and any accused will not be able to invoke prescription if a case is in the court.

Bonnici was responsible for a number of initiatives undertaken during the legislature, including the Whistleblowers' Act, Justice Reform and the Individual Investors' Program. When Malta's whistleblower laws were ranked second in European Union, Owen Bonnici had tweeted and Times of Malta reported: It is very easy to speak about the rule of law. It's harder to act and deliver to improve it. That is what we have been doing and will keep doing. This report about #whistleblowerprotection shows that the law we passed in 2013 is one of the best and most robust in the #EU.

Bonnici undertook strong reforms in the field of drug laws in order to stop treating victims of drug abuse as criminals but rather as people who need care and assistance to quit. He said that his reform was overall guided by common sense. We could have done nothing at all on drugs, but we have decided to take a decision and publish a white paper which is practical and clear, Bonnici said about it. The law was met by questions and concerns if it will give a message that it was okay to use drugs. To this, Bonnici responded by saying Former judge at the European Court of Human Rights Giovanni Bonello’s appointment as the head of a new drug court showed how serious the legal reform was about helping users while punishing those who lived off the profits of vice.

During his role as the culture minister, he expanded the existing Culture Pass program that allowed free access to various cultural events in the country and included students at all levels - kindergarten, primary and secondary. He also launched Teatru Malta a new theater project that aimed to create new content for people in the country.

He also successfully oversaw Valletta’s tenure as the European capital for culture in 2018. This experience effectively gave a new lease of life to the capital city. A final research report on the impacts of the capital of culture said as follows: Indeed, in the last five to ten years, Valletta enjoyed what may be called a great revival with various restoration projects that brought back life to the architecture of auberges, churches, palazzos, fortifications, and even streets … This urban regeneration of Valletta has also resulted in the sprawl of commercial activity. 

In 2015, Bonnici replaced the local enforcement system that was known to be maligned and replaced it with a new agency that would eventually become a regulatory authority.

He also launched a Party financing act along with then Law Commissioner Franco Debono for increased transparency and accountability that would reduce abuse by political parties and candidates. Malta Today reported on this: Bonnici described the current situation was a “free-for-all”, adding that the new law would transform the scenario into a more serious one.  The act would see political parties, of any size, and prominent party officials obliged to register with the Electoral Commission. Parties can lose their registration if they fail to present a candidate for ten years.

Further Reforms

Bonnici also led a Constitutional reform that would amend the constitution and bring reforms on how judicial appointments are made and more. The reform would create a new commission that would handle judicial appointments of  Chief Justice, Attorney General and the President of the Chamber of Advocates and also provide opinions on other judicial appointments.

Owen Bonnici also presented a legislative proposal in September 2016 that allowed people who were undergoing police interrogation to have a lawyer of their preference. This was done followed by a European Union Directive and the reform was given the green light by Parliament.

Owen Bonnici's also pushed forward an initiative that reduced the litigation period over disputed properties by multiple heirs.

As the Minister for Justice, Culture and Local Government, Owen Bonnici set up the Assets Recovery Bureau which was previously not existent and a fully fledged Department for Justice.

In 2017, Minister Owen Bonnici announced that the chairperson of regulatory bodies and politically appointed representatives in foreign countries would go through a consultative parliamentary committee grilling procedure and the scrutiny will be made publicly available prior to their appointment.

Owen Bonnici was reported to be in favour of the proposed amendments to the 1979 Housing Decontrol Ordinance. He believed those were fair to both tenants and land-owners.

During his time in charge of Education and Employment in 2020 Bonnici successfully oversaw the holding of exams and summer school and the sustainable re-opening of schools during the height of the COVID-19 pandemic and at a time where the population was not vaccinated as anti-COVID vaccines were still not available to the general public. The Malta Union of Teachers endorsed the Bonnici’s work.

Family 
Bonnici has a daughter Ema.

Controversy
On 30 January, 2020, the Constitutional Court of Malta ruled that Minister of Justice Bonnici had breached the human rights of protesters for justice for Daphne Caruana Galizia following the clearing at the foot of the Great Siege Monument throughout 2018 and 2019 during the evenings.
The Constitutional Court stated that Bonnici's orders amounted to a "systematic" censorship that led to an "absurd" and "divisive" situation that breached blogger and activist Emmanuel Delia and others' freedom of expression. 
Bonnici defended himself by saying that the clearings took place a full year after the horrific
murder of Daphne Caruana Galizia, in line with obtaining practice elsewhere in Europe and that the protestors themselves had retracted an action of the issuing of a
prohibitory injunction when the monument started being cleared at the day’s end, as all other national monuments. In passing reference was made to this controversy in a statement by the Council of Europe and the OSCE.

References

Members of the House of Representatives of Malta
1980 births
Living people
Labour Party (Malta) politicians
Government ministers of Malta
People from Żejtun
Human rights abuses in Malta